Cornelius Prout Newcombe (5 September 1825 – 30 July 1913) was an English vegetarianism and temperance activist, and a schoolmaster. He was also an early proponent of veganism.

Biography 
Newcombe was born in St Luke's, London, in 1825, the son of a butcher. He married Caroline Tunnicliff in 1835, in Coventry; they had four children. He formed a partnership with Griffiths, Newcombe, & Co., in the early 1850s, a company of insurance brokers and ship builders. The company collapsed in 1854 and Newcombe became a schoolmaster. He remarried in 1858, this time to Mary Kirk. In 1868, he founded the Alexandra Park College, in Hornsey. Later in his teaching career, Newcombe moved to New Zealand, where he worked as the head of various schools. In 1895, he returned to England, where he continued to work as a headteacher.

In 1911, Newcombe published The Manifesto of Vegetarianism, which was dedicated to John E. B. Mayor, Joseph Wallace and Albert Broadbent. Newcombe was the editor of The Vegetarian Messenger and Health Review, the Vegetarian Society's journal. In 1912, Newcombe wrote in the journal about a division he perceived between vegetarians, those who consumed animal products, and those who did not; he opened up the discussion to letters arguing for each side, receiving 24 responses. Newcombe was critical of the defences presented for consuming eggs and milk, arguing that "The only true way is to live on cereals, pulse, fruit, nuts and vegetables". Newcombe also asserted that humans were naturally vegetarian and that cancer could be cured by following a strict vegetarian diet; in 1906, he sought funding for the creation of a "Fruitarian Cancer Hospital".

Newcombe created and edited a journal on temperance, The Temperance Gazette, published by William Horsell; he was also a member of the National Temperance Association.

Newcombe died in 1913, at the age of 87, in Tonbridge, Kent. After Newcombe's death, a memorial prize essay competition was created in his honour by the Vegetarian Society.

Publications 
 "On Fish Eating", The Vegetarian, Vol. 4, 15 April 1899, pp. 145–150 
The Diet Cure of Cancer 
The Manifesto of Vegetarianism (London: Vegetarian Society, 1911)

References 

1825 births
1913 deaths
19th-century English educators
Alternative cancer treatment advocates
British vegetarianism activists
English magazine editors
English temperance activists
Heads of schools in London
Heads of schools in New Zealand
People associated with the Vegetarian Society
People from Islington (district)
Pseudoscientific diet advocates
School founders